Algarobius is a genus of pea and bean weevils in the beetle family Chrysomelidae. There are about six described species in Algarobius.

Species
These six species belong to the genus Algarobius:
 Algarobius atratus Kingsolver
 Algarobius bottimeri Kingsolver, 1972 (kiawe bean weevil)
 Algarobius johnsoni Kingsolver
 Algarobius nicoya Kingsolver
 Algarobius prosopis (J. L. LeConte, 1858)
 Algarobius riochama Kingsolver

References

External links

 

Bruchinae
Articles created by Qbugbot
Chrysomelidae genera